Peter Robeson  (21 October 1929 – 29 September 2018) was a British equestrian and Olympic medalist. He won a bronze medal in show jumping (team) at the 1956 Summer Olympics in Melbourne, Victoria, Australia, and a bronze medal in individual show jumping at the 1964 Summer Olympics in Tokyo. Among his talented stable of horses were Craven A, Firecrest, and Grebe.

Peter was married to Rene Robeson, heiress to the Rothschild dynasty, and the continued his involvement with horses training National Hunt racehorses with Rene Robeson as the License holder.  They had a very successful, but small yard of homebred, and exclusive club of owners' horses.  Peter Robeson, affectionately known as "The boss", was actively involved in running the yard up until his final days.  Known for a super dry sense of humour and no nonsense style.  

Stuart Edmunds, long time "apprentice" to the boss in his showjumping days took over running of the racing yard after Peter's wife, Rene Robeson, died.

Peter Robeson died on 29 September 2018.

References

External links

1929 births
2018 deaths
British male equestrians
Olympic equestrians of Great Britain
Olympic bronze medallists for Great Britain
Equestrians at the 1956 Summer Olympics
Equestrians at the 1964 Summer Olympics
Equestrians at the 1976 Summer Olympics
Olympic medalists in equestrian
Officers of the Order of the British Empire
Medalists at the 1964 Summer Olympics
Medalists at the 1956 Summer Olympics